The Howrah–Gaya Express is an Express train belonging to Eastern Railway zone that runs between  and  in India. It is currently being operated with 13023/13024 train numbers on a daily basis.

Service

The 13023/Howrah–Gaya Express has an average speed of 44 km/hr and covers 655 km in 14h 55m. The 13024/Gaya–Howrah Express has an average speed of 43 km/hr and covers 655 km in 15h 20m.

Route and halts 

The important halts of the train are:

Coach composition

The train has standard ICF rakes (UTKRISTH COACH) with max speed of 110 kmph. The train consists of 15 coaches:

 1 AC II Tier
 2 AC III Tier
 4 Sleeper coaches
 6 General
 2 Generators cum Luggage/parcel van

Traction

Both trains are hauled by a Howrah Loco Shed-based electric locomotive from Howrah to Gaya and vice versa.

See also 

 Howrah Junction railway station
 Gaya Junction railway station
 Doon Express

Notes

External links 

 13023/Howrah–Gaya Express
 13024/Gaya–Howrah Express

References 

Rail transport in Howrah
Transport in Gaya, India
Express trains in India
Rail transport in West Bengal
Rail transport in Jharkhand
Rail transport in Bihar